are a Japanese yōkai that appear in several yōkai emaki, such as the Hyakkai Zukan by Sawaki Suushi and the Gazu Hyakki Yagyō by Toriyama Sekien (1776).

Concept
In the Edo Period Hyakkai Zukan (1737, Sawaki Suushi), the Bakemonozukushi (化物づくし) (artist and date unknown, owned by Kagaya Rei), the Bakemono E (化物絵巻) (artist and date unknown, owned by the Kawasaki Citizen's Museum) and the Hyakkai Yagyō Emaki (1832, Oda Gōchō, owned by the Matsui library), among other emaki, as well as the e-sugoroku, Jikkai Sugoroku (owned by the National Diet Library), the Gazu Hyakki Yagyō among others, they are portrayed covered with long hair and with some hair hanging down in front of the face. There is no explanatory text besides their name, so it is unclear what kind of yōkai they were intending to depict.

Name
In emakimono such as the Hyakkai Zukan and the Bakemono Emaki, as well as the Jikkai Sugoroku and Gazu Hyakki Yagyō, they go under the name of "otoroshi," while in the "Bakemonozukushi," they are called "odoro odoro," while in the Hyakki Yagyō Emaki, they are depicted under the name of "Ke Ippai" (毛一杯, "much hair").

According to the Edo Period writing Kiyū Shōran (嬉遊笑覧), it can be seen that one of the yōkai that it notes is depicted in the Bakemono E (化物絵) drawn by Kōhōgen Motonobu is one by the name of "otoron."

Concerning the change in names such as "otoroshi" and "odoro odoro," the yōkai researcher Katsumi Tada posits that in the "Bakemonozukushi," the name written was actually "orodoku" (おどろく, to surprise) with the final く (ku) written very long (refer to image), so "otoroshi" (おとろし) could simply be a misreading of this. However, "odoro odoro" means "creepy, scary," as it is the adjective "odorodoroshii" (おどろおどろしい) turned into a noun, and "otorshi" is the Kamigata dialect way of saying "osoroshii" (恐ろしい, terrifying), so there is not much difference in meaning either way. The yōkai researchers Tada and Kenji Murakami posit that the word "odorogami" (棘髪), meaning extremely long growths of hair, is also contained in "odoro odoro". Furthermore, both the Hyakkai Zukan and the Gazu Hyakki Yagyō put the otorshi alongside the waira, and "wai" (畏) can be understood to mean fear, so it can be interpreted that the "waira" (恐い, fear) and "otoroshi" (恐ろしい, dread) are two yōkai that make up a pair.

Legends
The emakimono do not provide any explanatory text besides their name, and there is no written material that write about any related folk legends, so it is not clear where they ever appeared in legends.

In yōkai-related literature and children's illustrated yōkai reference books starting in the Shōwa and Heisei periods, it is often explained that when they find people who do imprudent or mischievous things at shrines, they would suddenly come falling from above. Also, in the Tōhoku Kaidan no Tabi (1974) by the author Norio Yamada, under the title of "Otoroshi," there is a story about how in Fukushima Prefecture, when the unfaithful who have never even once visited a temple go to their mother's funeral, upon passing under the temple gates, they would suddenly be seized by a thick arm and hoisted up. Kenji Murakami did not find any legends that followed this explanatory text and posits that this is nothing more than a made-up imagination based on Sekien's otoroshi picture in the Gazu Hyakki Yagyō (where it perches atop a torii).

Legend in Akita
While it is unknown what relation this may have with the otoroshi in yōkai pictures, in Yuki no Idewaji (雪の出羽路) (1814) by Edo Period traveler Sugae Masumi, there is the following story about a hill road:

In the same book is written that the "Sae no Kamizaka" (道祖ノ神坂) is in the town of Sakuraguchi, Inaniwa, Ogachi District Dewa Province (now the town of Inaniwa, Yuzawa, Akita Prefecture).

Also, in the public archives of Akita Prefecture, there is a nikuhitsu book titled Kubota Jōka Hyakumonogatari thought to be created by a warrior of the Akita Domain (author and year unknown), there is a depiction of a human-like yōkai with a huge head called the "Naganozaka Hiyama Yashiki no Odoroshi" as one of the yōkai called forth by the hitotsume-kozō.

Shishitori
The Bakemonozukushi Emaki (化け物尽し絵巻) (from the Edo Period, now in private possession and entrusted to a museum of the Fukuoka Prefecture), considered to be a yōkai emaki that was made for putting captions on previously existing yōkai pictures seen in emakimono, the otoroshi was introduced under the name of "shishitori" (しゝこり) (for unknown reasons, all the yōkai in this emaki had their names changed). In this caption, they have a height of about 8 shaku (about 1.8 meters), and a size of about 8 jō in area, and its mouth was 1 jō, 1 shaku in length (about 3.3 meters). They appear in a town called Narabayashi, Buzen Province (perhaps now Narabayashi, Tsunawaki, Iizuka, Fukuoka Prefecture), and they eat horses and cattle in one gulp. It is said that the end of a mountain hunt, it tried to hide in a cave, when it was finished off with a bamboo spear.

Mythology
The Otoroshi's name comes from a regional corruption of the word osoroshii meaning scary, frightening or disheveled. The Otoroshi is a rare and mysterious creature that resembles a hunched creature that is covered in a messy mane, has blue or red skin, and large tusks. It is a master of disguise and only appears when its wants to appear. The Otoroshi is often sighted perching on top of roofs, and temple gates. It will often pounce on anyone who has a wicked soul where it will tear them to shreds and eat their remains outside of their usual food of small birds. Despite their frightful appearances, the Otoroshi is loyal to the guardian deities.

Popular culture
 Different adaptions of Otoroshi appear in the Super Sentai franchise:
 In Samurai Sentai Shinkenger, the monster Ushirobushi is an Otoroshi-themed Ayakashi. In its adaption Power Rangers Samurai, the monster was adapted as "Robtish."
 In Shuriken Sentai Ninninger, the Otoroshi is the result of a sealing shuriken coming in contact with a lawn mower. In its adaption Power Rangers Ninja Steel, the monster was adapted as "Game Goblin."

 An Otoroshi is featured in Yo-kai Watch.

 In AdventureQuest Worlds, the Otoroshi lives on Yokai Island. One Otoroshi guards the gates of Green Shell Village until it was affected by the negative energy as a result of the fight with Jaaka and became hostile to everyone. The players had to lure the Otoroshi from the gates and defeat it. While Otoroshi sports a recolored and long-haired version of the Oni Fukumen helm for a head, its body is a recolored version of Spid-Squider's body.

External links
 Otoroshi at Yokai.com

Notes

References 
 
 

Yōkai